Paul Gustav Heinrich Bachmann (22 June 1837 – 31 March 1920) was a German mathematician.

Life
Bachmann studied mathematics at the university of his native city of Berlin and
received his doctorate in 1862 for his thesis on group theory.  He then went to Breslau to study for his habilitation, which he received in 1864 for his thesis on Complex Units.

Bachmann was a professor at Breslau and later at Münster.

Works
Zahlentheorie, Bachmann's work on number theory in five volumes (1872-1923):
Vol. I: Die Elemente der Zahlentheorie (1892)
Vol. II: Analytische Zahlentheorie (1894), a work on analytic number theory in which Big O notation was first introduced
Vol. III: Die Lehre von der Kreistheilung und ihre Beziehungen zur Zahlentheorie (first published in 1872)
Vol. IV (Part 1): Die Arithmetik der quadratischen Formen (1898)
Vol. IV (Part 2): Die Arithmetik der quadratischen Formen (posthumously published in 1923)
Vol. V: Allgemeine Arithmetik der Zahlenkörper (1905)
Niedere Zahlentheorie: First part (1902), Second part (1910), a two-volume work on elementary number theory
Das Fermat-Problem in seiner bisherigen Entwicklung, a work about Fermat's Last Theorem

References

External links
 
 
 Author profile in the database zbMATH

Further reading
 

1837 births
1920 deaths
Scientists from Berlin
19th-century German mathematicians
20th-century German mathematicians
Group theorists
Number theorists
Academic staff of the University of Münster